Hari Santhosh is an Indian film lyricist and director who predominantly works in the Kannada Film Industry. He is best known for 2012 film Alemari.

Early life
Hari Santhosh was born to Harish and Prema in Koppa, Sringeri and was Brought up in Bengaluru. Santhosh went to 'Sri Siddaganga school Rajajinagar' for his primary education. His father Harish worked as an Art Director in Kannada films and Santhosh accompanied his father in art departmental works during his early days.

Career
Hari Santhosh began his film career by working as an assistant director under Prem for the Kannada films Kariya, Excuse Me, Jogi, Ee Preethi Yeke Bhoomi Melide and as an associate director for Sanju Weds Geetha. 
Santhosh made his debut as a Director, Writer and Lyricist in the 2012 film Alemari starring Yogesh and Radhika Pandit. Many Critics appreciated the efforts of debut director Hari Santhosh and he was also awarded as the Director's First Time Best Film at Karnataka State Film Award. Later on Santhosh wrote story screenplay and directed several movies like Darling(2014), Dove(2015) and College Kumar(2017) which was officially remade in the year 2020 in Telugu and Tamil Languages. In the year 2020 Hari Santhosh Directed Bicchugatti: Chapter 1 – Dalavayi Dange which is a historical drama based on a book by Dr. B.L. Venu named ' Bicchugatti Baramanna Nayaka'. Currently Hari Santhosh is shooting for By 2 Love and another big budget action thriller 'Bumper' which is currently being filmed
.

Filmography

As lyricist

Awards and nominations

Footnotes

References

External links
 

Living people
1984 births
Kannada film directors
Film directors from Karnataka